Martha Tembo (born 8 March 1998) is a Zambian footballer who plays as a defender for the Zambia women's national team. She competed for Zambia at the 2018 Africa Women Cup of Nations, playing in three matches, as well as the 2020 Summer Olympics.

References

1998 births
Living people
Zambian women's footballers
Zambia women's international footballers
Women's association football defenders
Footballers at the 2020 Summer Olympics
Olympic footballers of Zambia